The Chamber of Mines building  in Johannesburg was constructed by the company of  Emely and Scott in 1921. It was then renovated by the partnership of Kef Gardiner & McFadyan. The building is owned by the South African Chamber of Mines which does not participate in mining directly but undertakes many functions and activities including research on behalf of the industry as a whole.

Design

On the exterior the building has aluminum art carvings designed by Major J. Gardener relating to different aspects of mining activities. The entrance hall has two murals designed by Phyllis Gardener depicting mining activities.

References

Mining in South Africa
Heritage Buildings in Johannesburg